Francis Galton (1822–1911) was an English Victorian polymath.

Galton may also refer to:

 Galton (name), includes a list of people with the name
 Galton, Illinois
 Galton Bridge, West Midlands, England
 Galton Institute
 Galton Junction, railway junction in England
 Galton Laboratory at University College, London
 Galton Village, West Midlands, England
 Galton–Watson process in probability theory